In algebraic geometry, the Schottky–Klein prime form E(x,y) of a compact Riemann surface X depends on two elements x and y of X, and vanishes if and only if x = y.  The prime form E is not quite a holomorphic function on X × X, but is a section of a holomorphic line bundle over this space. Prime forms were introduced by Friedrich Schottky and Felix Klein.

Prime forms can be used to construct meromorphic functions on X with given poles and zeros. If Σniai is a divisor linearly equivalent to 0, then ΠE(x,ai)ni is a meromorphic function with given poles and zeros.

See also

Fay's trisecant identity

References

Riemann surfaces